KTB mechatronics GmbH is the former name of qfix robotics GmbH, located in Senden, near Ulm, in the southern part of Germany.
The company develops and produces industrial products in the mechatronics and robotics field.

The main product is the qfix family of robot kits.

References

External links 
 qfix robotics GmbH homepage (formerly KTB mechatronics)
 qfix robot kits by qfix robotics GmbH

Engineering companies of Germany